The Bellerophon Painter was one of the first Attic black-figure vase painters. His period of activity is dated between 630 and 600 BC.

He was a contemporary of the Nessos Painter, whose importance and artistic class he did not reach. His known works are two neck amphora, one depicting Bellerophon, the other a chimera. Both were found at Vari and are now in the National Archaeological Museum at Athens (Inv. 16389 and 16391). A striking feature of his and his contemporaries’ works is the habit of filling the painted areas with many figures and ornaments that only be distinguished  with difficulty.

See also
 List of Greek vase painters

Bibliography 
 John D. Beazley: Attic Black-figure Vase-painters. Oxford, 1956, p. 2.
 John Boardman: Schwarzfigurige Vasen aus Athen. Ein Handbuch, von Zabern, 4th ed. Mainz, 1994 (Kulturgeschichte der Antiken Welt, Band 1.) , p. 18.

Ancient Greek vase painters
Artists of ancient Attica
7th-century BC Greek people
Anonymous artists of antiquity
7th-century BC painters